Tripedalism (from the Latin tri = three + ped = foot) is locomotion by the use of three limbs. It has been said that parrots (Psittaciformes) display tripedalism during climbing gaits, which was tested and proven in a 2022 paper on the subject, making parrots the only creatures to truly use tripedal forms of locomotion. Tripedal gaits were also observed by K. Hunt in primates. This is usually observed when the animal is using one limb to grasp a carried object and is thus a non-standard gait. Apart from climbing in parrots, there are no known animal behaviours where the same three extremities are routinely used to contact environmental supports, although the movement of some macropods such as kangaroos, which can alternate between resting their weight on their muscular tails and their two hind legs and hop on all three, may be an example of tripedal locomotion in animals. There are also the tripod fish. Several species of these fish rest on the ocean bottom on two rays from their two pelvic fins and one ray from their caudal fin.

Real-world tripedalism is rare, in contrast to the common bipedalism of two-legged animals and quadrupedalism of four-legged animals. The code for bilateral symmetry seems to have become entrenched very early in evolution, appearing even before appendages like legs, fins or flippers had evolved; with that template came a built-in bias toward even-numbered limb configurations.

Quadrupedal amputees and mutations 

There are some three-legged creatures in the world today, namely four-legged animals (such as pet dogs and cats) which have had one limb amputated. With proper medical treatment most of these injured animals can go on to live fairly normal lives, despite being artificially tripedal. There are also cases of mutations or birth abnormalities in animals (including humans) which have resulted in three legs.

Tripedalism in mythology, folklore and fiction 
Although largely absent from biology, three-legged creatures feature in the mythology and folklore of many cultures. Better-known examples include the sanzuwu or East Asian Three-legged crow; the Jin Chan or Chinese money toad; the chanchito, a three-legged pig from the Chilean village of Pomaire, and the helhest or ghost-horse from Denmark.

A three-legged triskelion is the central feature on the Flag of Sicily and the Flag of the Isle of Man.

In classic science fiction, the armored fighting machines in H. G. Wells’ novel The War of the Worlds are tripedal. More modern examples of fictional tripedal organisms include Species 8472, a race in the television series Star Trek: Voyager and Xorn, from the role-playing game Dungeons & Dragons.

See also 
 Bipedalism
 Quadrupedalism
 Terrestrial locomotion
 Tetrapod
 Uniped

References

Ethology
Terrestrial locomotion
Animal anatomy
Pedalism